Hans Rehmann (1900–1939) was a Swiss actor. He was one of the director Paul Czinner's favourite actors.

He was married to Anna Katharina Rehmann-Salten, the daughter of author Felix Salten.

Selected filmography
 Love (1927)
 The Woman He Scorned (1929)
 The Flute Concert of Sanssouci (1930)
 Chasing Fortune (1930)
 Checkmate (1931)
 The Paw (1931)
 Panic in Chicago (1931)
 Yorck (1931)
 Thea Roland (1932)
 Impossible Love (1932)

References

Bibliography
 Brinson, Charmian & Dove, Richard Dove & Taylor, Jennifer. Immortal Austria?: Austrians in Exile in Britain. Rodopi, 2007.

External links

1900 births
1939 deaths
Swiss male film actors
Swiss male silent film actors
Male actors from Zürich
20th-century Swiss male actors